John Stewart, Earl of Mar may refer to:

 John Stewart, Earl of Mar (d. 1479) (1450s–1470s), son of James II of Scotland
 John Stewart, Earl of Mar (d. 1503) (1470s–1503), son of James III of Scotland

See also
John Stewart (disambiguation)